Alpinia purpurata, commonly referred to as red ginger, also called ostrich plume and pink cone ginger, are native Malaysian plants with showy flowers on long brightly colored red bracts. They look like the bloom, but the true flower is the small white flower on top.

It has cultivars called Jungle King and Jungle Queen. Red Ginger grows in Hawaii, Trinidad, Grenada, St. Lucia, Panama, Dominica, St. Vincent, Martinique, Jamaica, Guadeloupe, Puerto Rico, Suriname (where its Dutch name is 'bokkepoot', billy-goat's foot), and many Central American nations, including Belize. It is also found in Samoa, where it is the national flower, and is locally called "teuila."

Red ginger can also be grown in South Florida since, in general, the region does not fall below freezing temperatures. It prefers partial shade and moist humid conditions, although it can tolerate full sun in some climates. It tends to like to be well watered and not left to dry out. Red ginger can also be grown as a houseplant and its cut flowers can be used in arrangements.

In Hawaii, the flowers are grown commercially and have a long-time flower associated with the Hamakua area. Once a very common flower, the flower growing community has experienced a decline in recent years, though is starting to make a come back. They are sometimes called "graveyard flowers" because they are customarily placed at loved ones headstones, because of their vigor & long-lasting cut-flower shelf life.

Gallery

References

External links

Images of Red Ginger
   Alpinia purpurata fotografiada Honolulu, Hawaii   Galería de Plantas del Mundo Oficina Verde de la Universidad de Murcia
 https://www.houstonchronicle.com/life/gardening/article/Try-these-3-summer-plants-to-add-color-to-beds-15234885.php
 https://www.news-press.com/story/life/2016/09/14/subtropical-pinecone-ginger-exotic-scarlet/90347722/

purpurata